The GWA Mazda Tennis Classic was a men's tennis tournament played in Brisbane, Australia from 1983 to 1985.  The event was part of the Grand Prix tennis circuit and was held on indoor carpet courts.

Finals

Singles

Doubles

References
ITF Vault
ITF Vault
ITF Vault

Grand Prix tennis circuit
Recurring sporting events disestablished in 1985
Recurring sporting events established in 1983
Sport in Brisbane
Defunct tennis tournaments in Australia
1983 establishments in Australia
1985 disestablishments in Australia